A Black Mass is a Satanic ritual.

Black Mass may also refer to:

Books and comics
 Black Mass (comics), a DC Comics supervillain
 Black Mass: Apocalyptic Religion and the Death of Utopia, a 2007 book by John N. Gray
 Black Mass, a 2000 non-fiction book by Dick Lehr and Gerald O'Neill about Boston mobster Whitey Bulger and inspiration for the 2015 film

Film and radio
 The Black Mass, a radio drama produced by Erik Bauersfeld
 A Black Mass, a 1966 play by Amiri Baraka
 Black Mass (film), a 2015 film about Boston mobster Whitey Bulger

Music
 Black Mass (band), thrash metal band from Boston, Massachusetts 
 Black Mass Krakow 2004, a live DVD by Gorgoroth
 Black Mass Sonata, a piano sonata by Alexander Scriabin
 Black Mass (album), a 2011 album by This Is Hell
 "Black Mass" (song), a 2016 song by Creeper
 "Black Mass", a song by Danzig from their 2002 album I Luciferi

Other uses
 Shadow person, a paranormal phenomenon also known as a "black mass"